Alsophila costularis, synonyms Cyathea chinensis and Sphaeropteris chinensis, is a species of tree fern native to Yunnan in China, Sikkim in India, as well as Nepal, Myanmar, Laos and Vietnam. Plants grow in forest and montane forest at an altitude of 900–1800 m. The trunk is erect and 1–2 m tall. Fronds are bipinnate and 1–2 m long. The stipe is either long and warty or has short spines towards the base as well as scattered glossy dark brown scales with fragile edges. Sori occur near the midvein of fertile pinnules and are covered by thin indusia.

Taxonomy
The nomenclature of the species varies, . Plants of the World Online treats it in the genus Alsophila as Alsophila costularis. World Ferns treats it in the genus Sphaeropteris as Sphaeropteris chinensis, although this combination had not been formally published. World Ferns also lists many more synonyms.

References

costularis
Ferns of Asia
Flora of China
Ferns of India
Flora of Nepal
Flora of Myanmar
Flora of Laos
Flora of Vietnam
Indomalayan realm flora
Plants described in 1909